Kõrgessaare Nature Reserve is a nature reserve situated on Hiiumaa island in western Estonia, in Hiiu County.

The nature reserve has been formed to protect an area of old-growth forest, springs, coastal meadows and a karst area. It is notable for its abundance of different species of orchid; around 15 are known to grow in the nature reserve, including lesser twayblade, lady's slipper, fly orchid and musk orchid. It is also known as a breeding spot and stopover for migratory birds.

References

Nature reserves in Estonia
Geography of Hiiu County